L'arbitro may refer to:

 L'arbitro (1974 film), a film starring Joan Collins
 L'arbitro (2013 film), a film starring Stefano Accorsi